Comantella is a genus of robber flies in the family Asilidae. There are at least four described species in Comantella.

Species
These four species belong to the genus Comantella:
 Comantella cristata (Coquillett, 1893) i c g
 Comantella fallei (Back, 1909) i c g
 Comantella pacifica Curran, 1926 i c g b
 Comantella rotgeri James, 1937 i c g
Data sources: i = ITIS, c = Catalogue of Life, g = GBIF, b = Bugguide.net

References

Further reading

 
 
 

Asilidae
Articles created by Qbugbot
Asilidae genera